The 2022–23 Bulgarian Cup is the 41st official edition of the Bulgarian annual football knockout tournament. It is sponsored by Sesame and known as the Sesame Kupa na Bulgaria for sponsorship purposes. The competition should begin on 21 September 2022 with the preliminary round and finish with the final on 24 May 2023. Levski Sofia were the defending cup winners, but were eliminated by Ludogorets Razgrad in the round of 16. The winner qualifies for the second qualifying round of the 2023–24 UEFA Europa Conference League.

Participating clubs
The following 47 teams qualified for the competition:

Matches

Preliminary round
The draw was conducted on 2 September 2022. The games were played on 22 September 2022. In this stage participated the 16 winners from the regional amateur competitions and 15 non-reserve teams from the Second League. During the draw, Chernomorets Balchik received a bye to the round of 32.

Round of 32
The draw for this round, together with the draw for the round of 16, was conducted on 11 October 2022. The games shall be played between 16 and 27 November 2022. In this stage participate the 15 winners from the previous round, Chernomorets Balchik (who received a bye) and the 16 teams from the First League.

Round of 16
The draw was conducted on 11 October 2022, immediately after the draw for the round of 32. The games were played between 26 November and 4 December 2022. In this stage the participants are the 16 winners from the previous round.

Quarter-finals
The draw was conducted on 12 December 2022. The games should be played between 3 and 5 April 2023. In this stage the participants are the 8 winners from the previous round.

Notes

References

Bulgarian Cup seasons
Bulgarian Cup
Cup